Masfjorden is a municipality in the central part of Vestland county in Norway. The municipality is located in the Nordhordland district of the county. The administrative centre of the municipality is the village of Masfjordnes. Other villages in the municipality include Frøyset, Hosteland, Matre, and Solheim.

The municipality is centered on the Masfjorden which almost divides the municipality completely into a north side and a south side. A cable ferry crosses the fjord from Masfjordnes to Duesund in the western part of the municipality. The Matre Hydroelectric Power Station is located in the eastern part of the municipality.

The  municipality is the 195th largest by area out of the 356 municipalities in Norway. Masfjorden is the 297th most populous municipality in Norway with a population of 1,629.

General information

The parish of Masfjorden was established as a municipality on 1 March 1879 when it was separated from the large municipality of Lindås. Masfjorden was the northern part of Lindås, and its initial population was 2,336. During the 1960s, there were many municipal mergers across Norway due to the work of the Schei Committee. On 1 January 1964, the Einestrand, Eikebotn, and Kikallen area along the Austfjorden (population: 25) was transferred from Lindås to Masfjorden.

Name
The municipality is named after the Masfjorden, the fjord which runs through it. The Old Norse form of the name was Matrsfjǫrðr. The first element is the genitive case of the old (uncompounded) name of the fjord: Matr. This name is derived from matr which means "food" - and the meaning of the fjord name is "the one full of food (fish)". The village of Matre lies at the inner end of the fjord, and that name has a similar origin.

Coat of arms
The coat of arms was granted on 28 September 1990. The arms feature three gold heldrer, a traditional tool made of wood for fastening a rope around a load. They are meant to symbolize unity as well as the importance of forestry. Three of these objects appear in yellow and they are centered on a field of red.

Churches
The Church of Norway has one parish within the municipality of Masfjorden. It is part of the Nordhordland prosti (deanery) in the Diocese of Bjørgvin. Prior to 2020, the municipality had three parishes (Frøyset, Sandnes, and Solheim).

Government
All municipalities in Norway, including Masfjorden, are responsible for primary education (through 10th grade), outpatient health services, senior citizen services, unemployment and other social services, zoning, economic development, and municipal roads. The municipality is governed by a municipal council of elected representatives, which in turn elect a mayor.  The municipality falls under the Hordaland District Court and the Gulating Court of Appeal.

Municipal council
The municipal council of Masfjorden is made up of 17 representatives that are elected to four year terms. The party breakdown of the council is as follows:

Mayor
The mayors of Masfjorden (incomplete list):
2011–present: Karstein Totland (Sp)
2003-2011: Håkon Matre (H)

Geography

Masfjorden municipality lies to the east of the Fensfjorden and Austfjorden. The Masfjorden runs east to west bisecting the municipality. The eastern part has mountains and as one heads westward, the land levels out before reaching the fjord in the east.

The municipality lies along the west coast in the central part of the county. The municipalities of Gulen and Høyanger lie to the north, the municipality of Modalen to the east, and the municipality of Alver lies to the south and west.

The European route E39 highway runs through eastern Masfjorden heading north and south.

Notable people 
 Hans Bergersen Wergeland (1861–1931) a Norwegian politician, local Mayor and farmer
 Ludvig Hope (1871–1954) a Norwegian lay preacher, writer and teacher
 Einar Hope (born 1937) a Norwegian economist
 Bjarne Johannes Hope (1944-2006) a Norwegian civil servant.

References

External links

Municipal fact sheet from Statistics Norway 

 
Municipalities of Vestland
1879 establishments in Norway